Ferrovia Rimini–San Marino was an electrified narrow gauge railway that connected Rimini, Italy and San Marino. The line was opened in 1932 after four years of construction.  It was a 32 km long, 950 mm gauge, 3000 V direct current electrified railway. The line was built by Società Anonima delle Ferrovie e Tramvie Padane, with 12 tunnels and 6 major bridges. The railway was closed in World War II and was not reopened after the war. Roads, bicycle roads and residences were built on the railway track.

During the war, a blue electric car was kept in a tunnel where it remained for 67 years after the war. The train was restored by a citizen's initiative and made operational. In 2012, 800 meters of the track was reconstructed and opened to service at the San Marino terminal station with the original train as a tourist attraction.

History

For a few years prior to World War II, San Marino had a railway network consisting of a single line, connecting the country with the Italian rail network at Rimini railway station. Due to difficulties in accessing the capital, San Marino City (which has a mountain-top location), the terminus station was to be located at the village of Valdragone. However, with a joint effort between San Marino and Italy the railway was extended to reach the capital through a steep and winding track comprising many tunnels. The railway was opened on 12 June 1932.

It was an advanced system for its time, being an electric railway, powered by overhead electric cables. The trains drew power from these cables by means of a pantograph system.
The tracks were narrow gauge, which offered advantages in terms of costs and ease of construction given the geographical features of the route, but made the railway incompatible with the Italian network.
The train carriages had a distinctive appearance, being liveried in the national colours of San Marino, blue and white layered horizontally; the service offered first class and third class seats.
There were 17 tunnels, all located within Sammarinese territory, ranging from about 50 m to 800 m in length.

The railway was well built and well used, and in all probability would have been a long-term feature of Sammarinese public transport, but it was almost completely destroyed during the fighting in this region during World War II. Today there is no operational railway in San Marino, but many disused artifacts such as bridges, tunnels and stations are still well visible, and in some cases have been refurbished and converted to parks, public footpaths or traffic routes.

Current state
Most of the tunnels are well preserved today and three of them have been checked for safety, provided with lighting and opened for pedestrian use. Most of the others have either been closed for safety reasons or purchased privately for storage. Inside the last tunnel, about 500 m long, closest to the former San Marino station, some of the train coaches once used are still being preserved.

Some of the bridges and other constructions used by the former railway have become well loved landmarks, especially the "Fontevecchia" bridge, set in a pleasant countryside location.
Dogana's station is now the centre of a large public park. Other stations have either been converted to private homes or demolished.

Beginning on 21 July 2012, next to the terminal station of the City of San Marino, an 800 m-long electrified stretch was reactivated for tourist and promotional reasons. This was the first step to reactivate the rail line, or part of it, and the government of San Marino is committed to the restoration of the line to Borgo Maggiore.

References
 
 
 
 
 

Rail transport in San Marino
950 mm gauge railways in Italy
Railway lines in Emilia-Romagna
Railway lines opened in 1932
Railway lines closed in 1944
Railway lines opened in 2012